Colasposoma is a genus of leaf beetles in the subfamily Eumolpinae. It is known from Africa, Asia and Australia.

C. sellatum, C. auripenne (now known as C. viridicoeruleum) and C. dauricum are known as pests of sweet potatoes.

List of species
Subgenus Colasposoma Laporte, 1833

 Colasposoma abdominale Baly, 1864
 Colasposoma acaciae Bryant, 1944
 Colasposoma aemulum Lefèvre, 1886
 Colasposoma aeneicolor Pic, 1939
 Colasposoma aeneoviolaceum Burgeon, 1941
 Colasposoma aeneoviolaceum aeneoviolaceum Burgeon, 1941
 Colasposoma aeneoviolaceum elisabethae Burgeon, 1941
 Colasposoma akaense Selman, 1972
 Colasposoma alutaceum Jacoby, 1900
 Colasposoma amplicolle Lefèvre, 1877
 Colasposoma angolense Pic, 1939
 Colasposoma antennale Jacoby, 1881
 Colasposoma apicale Jacoby, 1881
 Colasposoma apicipenne Tan, 1983
 Colasposoma ardens Harold, 1879
 Colasposoma aruwimiense Gahan, 1892
 Colasposoma atrocyaneum Zoia, 2012
 Colasposoma aurichalcicum (J. Thomson, 1858)
 Colasposoma auripes Jacoby, 1894
 Colasposoma auripes auripes Jacoby, 1894
 Colasposoma auripes kafakumbae Burgeon, 1941
 Colasposoma austerum Zoia, 2012
 Colasposoma balyi Jacoby, 1904
 Colasposoma basicostatum Weise, 1919
 Colasposoma bedeli Achard, 1923
 Colasposoma beiraense Jacoby, 1904
 Colasposoma benguelanum Achard, 1924
 Colasposoma benningseni Weise, 1902
 Colasposoma birmanicum Medvedev, 2007
 Colasposoma blandum Weise, 1904
 Colasposoma bonvouloiri Lefèvre, 1877
 Colasposoma bottegoi Jacoby, 1899
 Colasposoma brevepilosum Zoia, 2012
 Colasposoma brevepilosum brevepilosum Zoia, 2012
 Colasposoma brevepilosum maritimum Zoia, 2012
 Colasposoma brevepilosum orientale Zoia, 2012
 Colasposoma camerunense Jacoby, 1903
 Colasposoma chailluensis Selman, 1970
 Colasposoma chapuisi (Harold, 1874)
 Colasposoma chloris Lefèvre, 1877
 Colasposoma coerulescens Motschulsky, 1860
 Colasposoma coffeae Kolbe, 1911
 Colasposoma collare Achard, 1923
 Colasposoma collare Zoia, 2020 (homonym of previous)
 Colasposoma colmanti Burgeon, 1941
 Colasposoma compactum Gerstaecker, 1871
 Colasposoma concinnum Weise, 1905
 Colasposoma conradi Jacoby, 1900
 Colasposoma consimile Gahan, 1909
 Colasposoma costatum Harold, 1877
 Colasposoma crampeli Pic, 1941
 Colasposoma crenulatum Gerstaecker, 1855
 Colasposoma crenulatum crenulatum Gerstaecker, 1855
 Colasposoma crenulatum karibaense Zoia, 2007
 Colasposoma curtepilosum Pic, 1942
 Colasposoma curvipes Jacoby, 1901
 Colasposoma cyaneicorne Pic, 1932
 Colasposoma cyaneocupreum Fairmaire, 1887
 Colasposoma dahomeyanum Aslam, 1968
 Colasposoma dauricum (Mannerheim, 1849)
 Colasposoma davidi Lefèvre, 1887
 Colasposoma densatum Fairmaire, 1887
 Colasposoma dentaticolle Pic, 1953
 Colasposoma dentipes (Fabricius, 1801)
 Colasposoma distinctum Baly, 1867
 Colasposoma diversipenne Pic, 1939
 Colasposoma downesii Baly, 1862
 Colasposoma downesii asperatum Lefèvre, 1885
 Colasposoma downesii downesii Baly, 1862
 Colasposoma ertli Weise, 1905
 Colasposoma erythreanum Pic, 1939
 Colasposoma fairmairei Lefèvre, 1877
 Colasposoma fairmairei fairmairei Lefèvre, 1877
 Colasposoma fairmairei katangense Burgeon, 1941
 Colasposoma favareli Pic, 1938
 Colasposoma flavipes Harold, 1877
 Colasposoma flavolimbatum (Pic, 1905)
 Colasposoma fulgidipenne Achard, 1923
 Colasposoma fulgidum Lefèvre, 1877
 Colasposoma fulvipes Lefèvre, 1877
 Colasposoma gabonense Jacoby, 1894
 Colasposoma geminatum Weise, 1922
 Colasposoma geniculatum Weise, 1905
 Colasposoma gibbicolle Jacoby, 1881
 Colasposoma gloriosum Weise, 1902
 Colasposoma gregarium Lefèvre, 1886
 Colasposoma haefligeri Weise, 1906
 Colasposoma hajeki Zoia, 2012
 Colasposoma hirsutum Burgeon, 1941
 Colasposoma holasi Pic, 1953
 Colasposoma homolamprum Fairmaire, 1902
 Colasposoma inconstans Baly, 1864
 Colasposoma instabile Harold, 1877
 Colasposoma iturianum Weise, 1912
 Colasposoma jacksoni Bryant, 1957
 Colasposoma jucundum Lefèvre, 1877
 Colasposoma keyense Pic, 1943
 Colasposoma kindaense Burgeon, 1941
 Colasposoma langeri Zoia, 2020
 Colasposoma laticolle Jacoby, 1900
 Colasposoma laticorne (J. Thomson, 1858)
 Colasposoma lividipes Jacoby, 1903
 Colasposoma longipes Jacoby, 1881
 Colasposoma lucubense Brancsik, 1893
 Colasposoma luluense Burgeon, 1941
 Colasposoma macrocnemis Burgeon, 1941
 Colasposoma madagassum Harold, 1877
 Colasposoma madoni Pic, 1942
 Colasposoma magnificum Bryant, 1957
 Colasposoma marshalli Jacoby, 1898
 Colasposoma mauricei Medvedev, 2003
 Colasposoma mediocre Fairmaire, 1902
 Colasposoma melancholicum Jacoby, 1881
 Colasposoma metallicum Clark, 1865
 Colasposoma micheli Pic, 1952
 Colasposoma mirabile Jacoby, 1904
 Colasposoma monardi Pic, 1939
 Colasposoma monticola Weise, 1909
 Colasposoma neavei Bryant, 1957
 Colasposoma nepalense Kimoto, 2001
 Colasposoma nigriventre Baly, 1867
 Colasposoma nigroaeneum Motschulsky, 1860
 Colasposoma nitens Weise, 1919
 Colasposoma obscurum Jacoby, 1900
 Colasposoma ornatum Jacoby, 1881
 Colasposoma ovatum Achard, 1923
 Colasposoma overlaeti Burgeon, 1941
 Colasposoma ovulum Lefèvre, 1885
 Colasposoma parvicolle Burgeon, 1941
 Colasposoma parvulum Lefèvre, 1890
 Colasposoma perlatum Harold, 1880
 Colasposoma perrieri Jacoby, 1904
 Colasposoma piceitarse Jacoby, 1904
 Colasposoma pilosum Lefèvre, 1885
 Colasposoma pilosum Pic, 1943 (homonym of previous)
 Colasposoma plumbeum Jacoby, 1898
 Colasposoma posticum Weise, 1905
 Colasposoma pradieri Lefèvre, 1877
 Colasposoma prasinum Clavareau, 1909
 Colasposoma pretiosum Baly, 1860
 Colasposoma propinquum Baly, 1867
 Colasposoma pubescens Lefèvre, 1877
 Colasposoma pubipenne Jacoby, 1898
 Colasposoma purcharti Zoia, 2012
 Colasposoma purpuratum Motschulsky, 1860
 Colasposoma purpureicolor Pic, 1939
 Colasposoma purpureipenne Pic, 1941
 Colasposoma purpureocinctum Pic, 1942
 Colasposoma pusillum Jacoby, 1904
 Colasposoma pustuliferum Pic, 1939
 Colasposoma quadrimaculatum Weise, 1919
 Colasposoma reygnaulti Pic, 1942
 Colasposoma robustum Jacoby, 1881
 Colasposoma ruficolle Bryant, 1957
 Colasposoma rufimembris Pic, 1942
 Colasposoma rufipes (Fabricius, 1793) (?)
 Colasposoma rufipes Jacoby, 1900 (homonym of previous)
 Colasposoma rugatum Achard, 1923
 Colasposoma rugulosum Baly, 1867
 Colasposoma rutilans (Klug, 1833)
 Colasposoma sansibaricum Harold, 1879
 Colasposoma scapulatum Fairmaire, 1903
 Colasposoma scutellare Lefèvre, 1877
 Colasposoma sellatum Baly, 1878
 Colasposoma semiasperum Fairmaire, 1902
 Colasposoma semicostatum Jacoby, 1908
 Colasposoma semihirsutum Jacoby, 1898
 Colasposoma semipurpureum Jacoby, 1901
 Colasposoma senegalense Laporte, 1833
 Colasposoma senegalense (Klug, 1835) (homonym of previous)
 Colasposoma separatum Lefèvre, 1877
 Colasposoma sheppardi Jacoby, 1904
 Colasposoma splendidum (Fabricius, 1792)
 Colasposoma subaureum Jacoby, 1900
 Colasposoma subcostatum Gerstaecker, 1871
 Colasposoma sublaeve Fairmaire, 1903
 Colasposoma subnigrum Pic, 1939
 Colasposoma subopacum Weise, 1919
 Colasposoma subpurpureum Pic, 1942
 Colasposoma subsericum Harold, 1879
 Colasposoma sumptuosum Weise, 1906
 Colasposoma suturale Zoia, 2020
 Colasposoma tarsale Jacoby, 1881
 Colasposoma tenenbaumi Pic, 1943
 Colasposoma tibiale Baly, 1878
 Colasposoma timorense Pic, 1943
 Colasposoma tinantae Burgeon, 1941
 Colasposoma tokeri Bryant, 1957
 Colasposoma transvalense Jacoby, 1897
 Colasposoma transversicolle Jacoby, 1889
 Colasposoma tumidulum Weise, 1904
 Colasposoma unicostatum Zoia, 2012
 Colasposoma varendorffi Weise, 1914
 Colasposoma variabile Jacoby, 1881
 Colasposoma varicolor Fairmaire, 1887
 Colasposoma vedyi Burgeon, 1941
 Colasposoma velutinum Lefèvre, 1885
 Colasposoma versicolor Lefèvre, 1887
 Colasposoma vestitum J. Thomson, 1858
 Colasposoma vicinale Tan, 1983
 Colasposoma villosulum Lefèvre, 1885
 Colasposoma viridicoeruleum Motschulsky, 1860
 Colasposoma viridicolle Fairmaire, 1887
 Colasposoma viridifasciatum Motschulsky, 1860
 Colasposoma viridivittatum Baly, 1865
 Colasposoma williamsi Bryant, 1957
 Colasposoma wittei Burgeon, 1941
 Colasposoma yunnanum Fairmaire, 1888
 Colasposoma zavattarii Pic, 1938

Subgenus Falsonerissus Pic, 1951 (Synonyms: Iranomolpus Lopatin, 1979; Andosiomorpha Lopatin, 1981; Bezdekia Warchałowski, 2005)
 Colasposoma argentatum (Lopatin, 1981)
 Colasposoma badium (Lopatin, 1979)
 Colasposoma coracinum (Lopatin, 1996)
 Colasposoma distinguendum Zoia, 2012
 Colasposoma grande (Lefèvre, 1890)
 Colasposoma grande grande (Lefèvre, 1890)
 Colasposoma grande insulare Zoia, 2012
 Colasposoma socotranum (Gahan, 1903)
 Colasposoma tenebrosum (Warchałowski, 2005)
 Colasposoma villosum Zoia, 2012

Synonyms:
 Colasposoma aeneoviride Clark, 1865: synonym of Colaspoides cuprea Baly, 1867
 Colasposoma albopilosum Pic, 1943: synonym of Colasposoma villosulum Lefèvre, 1885
 Colasposoma andrewesi Jacoby, 1895: synonym of Colasposoma downesii asperatum Lefèvre, 1885
 Colasposoma arcuateimpressum Pic, 1943: synonym of Colasposoma robustum Jacoby, 1881
 Colasposoma asperatum Fairmaire, 1902 (not C. downesii asperatum Lefèvre, 1885): renamed to Colasposoma perrieri Jacoby, 1904
 Colasposoma aureovittatum Baly, 1864: synonym of Colasposoma downesii downesii Baly, 1862
 Colasposoma auripenne Motschulsky, 1860: synonym of Colasposoma viridicoeruleum Motschulsky, 1860
 Colasposoma bicoloratum Jacoby, 1908: synonym of Colasposoma robustum Jacoby, 1881
 Colasposoma bonnevili Pic, 1943: synonym of Colasposoma pretiosum Baly, 1860
 Colasposoma castetsi Pic, 1943: synonym of Colasposoma semicostatum Jacoby, 1908
 Colasposoma coimbatorense Pic, 1943: synonym of Colasposoma robustum Jacoby, 1881
 Colasposoma coromandeliana Jacoby, 1908: synonym of Colasposoma robustum Jacoby, 1881
 Colasposoma cumingi Baly, 1867: synonym of Colasposoma viridifasciatum Motschulsky, 1860
 Colasposoma cyaneicollis Pic, 1943: synonym of Colasposoma robustum Jacoby, 1881
 Colasposoma cyaneovittatum Pic, 1943: synonym of Colasposoma ornatum Jacoby, 1881
 Colasposoma gregarium Lefèvre, 1886: synonym of Colasposoma viridifasciatum Motschulsky, 1860
 Colasposoma madoni Pic, 1943 (not C. madoni Pic, 1942): renamed to Colasposoma mauricei Medvedev, 2003
 Colasposoma mutabile Baly, 1867: synonym of Colasposoma viridicoeruleum Motschulsky, 1860
 Colasposoma nathani Pic, 1943: synonym of Colasposoma robustum Jacoby, 1881
 Colasposoma nitidum Baly, 1867: synonym of Colasposoma distinctum Baly, 1867
 Colasposoma prosternale Jacoby, 1908: synonym of Colasposoma downesii asperatum Lefèvre, 1885
 Colasposoma ramnadense Pic, 1943: synonym of Colasposoma semicostatum Jacoby, 1908
 Colasposoma ruficorne Pic, 1943: synonym of Colasposoma lividipes Jacoby, 1903
 Colasposoma rufipenne Pic, 1943: synonym of Colasposoma pretiosum Baly, 1860
 Colasposoma rufofemorale Pic, 1943: synonym of Colasposoma lividipes Jacoby, 1903
 Colasposoma rufum (Pic, 1941): moved to Lefevrea
 Colasposoma rugiceps Lefèvre, 1885: synonym of Colasposoma distinctum Baly, 1867
 Colasposoma rugipenne Motschulsky, 1860: moved to Colaspoides
 Colasposoma serratulum Lefèvre, 1885: synonym of Colasposoma downesii asperatum Lefèvre, 1885
 Colasposoma sparsepunctatum Pic, 1943: synonym of Colasposoma robustum Jacoby, 1881
 Colasposoma viridicinctum Pic, 1943: synonym of Colasposoma versicolor Lefèvre, 1887
 Colasposoma viridigeniculatum Pic, 1943: synonym of Colasposoma lividipes Jacoby, 1903

References

External links
 Biolib
 Atlas of living Australia
 Genus Colasposoma Laporte, 1833 at Australian Faunal Directory

 
Chrysomelidae genera
Taxa named by François-Louis Laporte, comte de Castelnau
Beetles of Africa
Beetles of Asia
Beetles of Australia